Glauber Rocha Airport  is the airport serving Vitória da Conquista, Brazil. It is named after the Brazilian Film Director Glauber de Andrade Rocha, who was born at Vitória da Conquista.

It is administrated by Socicam.

History
The airport opened on July 25, 2019. It replaced the former airport of Vitória da Conquista, Pedro Otacílio Figueiredo Airport.

Airlines and destinations

Access

See also

List of airports in Brazil

References

External links

Airports in Bahia
Airports established in 2019